Oldtown is a district of Letterkenny, County Donegal, Ireland, in the parish of Conwal and Leck to the south of the River Swilly. As its name suggests, it is the oldest part of Letterkenny—being older than Letterkenny itself—and was the starting point of the area's development.

Oldtown is bordered by Creeve to the west and Lismonaghan to the south. It may be entered from central Letterkenny on its northern flank via the Oldtown Bridge (for traffic) or Devlin Way (for pedestrians). The Rail Bridge (formerly used for trains run by the Lough Swilly Railway) is now disused, and is the only remaining evidence of Oldtown railway station.

Oldtown has a weak range of essential services, as it is primarily green spaces within housing developments; its residents mostly utilize services in the town centre, rather than Oldtown itself.

History
Oldtown existed as a Native Irish settlement before the plantation of Ulster, which saw Patrick Crawford develop the market town on the other side of the Swilly at the Oldtown Bridge. Oldtown's early inhabitants spoke Gaelic, and their main food source was fishing in the Swilly estuary, which flowed up to Conwal Cemetery. They also raised livestock on the hillside where Leck Graveyard is today.

Oldtown railway station was located on the Letterkenny & Burtonport Extension line. It opened on 9 March 1903, and closed for passengers and goods on 6 January 1947. There is no evidence of the station today, as a hotel occupies the site. However, an old rail bridge still crosses the River Swilly.

The stone bridge which gives residents passage to the town is appropriately old, but also crumbling.

Administration

Local and national government
Seán Maloney resided in the area during his time as a Senator representing the Labour Party. Other politicians with links to the area include Mayors Victor Fisher and Dessie Larkin of Fianna Fáil, as well as Larkin's father James, founder of Independent Fianna Fáil.

There is also a local residents' association.

Policing and crime
Recorded crime in Oldtown include incidents of theft. During the COVID-19 pandemic, an assault by a local on paramedics and hospital workers was reported. Illegal dumping has also been reported.

According to politician Gerry McMonagle, there is "a serious lack of facilities in Oldtown. There is a particular problem there of lifebuoy rings being stolen in Oldtown".

A 2020 report described Oldtown as a "heavily populated" area.

Amenities and business

Small local stores include Oldtown Stores  and Larkin's Shop.  Old Dunnes, the nearest department store to the area, is located on the opposite side of the Oldtown Bridge.

Former industries in the Oldtown include the Model Bakery, where the local children would gather to be fed free buns. There was also the Gaeltex Factory. Charlie Devlin had a mobile shop. Current employers in the area include Dunnes Stores, NowDoc, Jungle King and The Hide Out Bar (Oldtown Inn), which was established in the 19th century. The pub was redeveloped in 2008 and was awarded the most improved public house by the then Minister for the Environment, John Gormley. However, its new owner John G. Larkin, had ties with Dessie Larkin, the Fianna Fáil mayor and councillor (Gormley was in coalition with Fianna Fáil at this time). The pub was later renamed The Snug.

A fire occurred at the Model Bakery in April 2020.

Religious institutions
Old Leck Church is situated in Oldtown, as is the adjacent Old Leck Graveyard. The nearby New Leck Graveyard, which alongside Conwal Cemetery houses the town's dead, is also located within Oldtown.

Education
The nearest primary school is Scoil Colmcille. Secondary education for young men is provided by St Eunan's College, girls are sent to the nuns at the local convent and a "vocational school" is also available, though each is a significant walking distance from the area. Some residents have also taken posts as teachers in the local primary and secondary schools.

Notable people
 Jim Clarke – footballer who played for Donegal
 Seán Maloney – served as a Labour Panel Senator in Seanad Éireann
 Ryan McConnell – former association football player with Manchester United and Finn Harps
 John Nee – actor

Sport

Clubs
Soccer (association football)
Oldtown Celtic, founded in 1976, is the local soccer club. They play their home games at Oldtown Park. They enjoy a fierce rivalry with Glencar Celtic. Letterkenny Rovers senior men's team compete in the Ulster Senior League and play their home games at Leckview Park, which is just across the river from Oldtown.

GAA
The nearest Gaelic football club to Oldtown is St Eunan's.

Golf
Golfing facilities opened in 1913 on a 47-acre (190,000 m2) nine-hole course at Crievesmith. The course was sold in 1965 for £3000 and the club moved to its current home at Barnhill. Due to the area's growing population the land was developed into housing at the turn of the 21st century.

Localities and housing
The area contains approximately 600 residential properties.

Residential areas include Brookcourt, Luí Na Gréine and Ros Suilighe.

A 2009 report on the Jim Larkin Court and Gaeltex Drive blocks of flats noted a lack of facilities or play area for children and families.

McNeely Villas, developed by Con Harvey and named in honour of the then recently deceased Bishop of Raphoe William MacNeely, was built in 1969 and opened the following year. Originally comprising 40 houses, four others were later added. At its fiftieth anniversary in 2020, one third of the original residents still lived there.

References

Geography of Letterkenny